Francisco Alves may refer to:

People
Francisco Alves Albino (1912–1993), Portuguese footballer
Francisco Alves (water polo) (born 1923), Portuguese water polo player
Francisco Alves Ataíde, Governor of Espírito Santo
Francisco Alves (singer) (1898–1952), Brazilian singer

Places
Francisco Alves, Paraná, a municipality in Brazil

Alves, Francisco